St Marie's Church is a Roman Catholic parish church in Bury, Greater Manchester, England. It was built from 1841 to 1842 in the Gothic Revival style. It is situated between the Manchester Road and Back Knowsley Street in the town centre. It is a Grade II listed building.

History

Foundation
After the Reformation, a priest would come from Rochdale to serve the local Catholic population of Bury. In 1825, a mission was started in Bury and the first priest was a Fr Peacock. He would celebrate Mass in Bury as well as travel to Heywood, Radcliffe, Elton and Tottington to serve the Catholic communities there.

Construction
In 1841, the architect John Harper from York was commissioned to design the church and presbytery. Construction started that year, and the next year, 1842, the church was opened. With the increasing population of the town and the surrounding area, more missions were started from the church. New churches would be constructed resulting from these missions such as St Joseph's Church in Bury.

Parish
In 2009, the parishes of St Marie's Church and St Joseph's Church were merged. St Marie's Church has one Sunday Mass at 11:30am and St Joseph's Church has two Sunday Masses at 5:00pm on Saturday and at 9:15am on Sunday.

Exterior

See also
 Listed buildings in Bury
 Diocese of Salford

References

External links
 

Buildings and structures in Bury, Greater Manchester
Roman Catholic churches in Greater Manchester
Grade II listed churches in the Metropolitan Borough of Bury
Roman Catholic Diocese of Salford
Roman Catholic churches completed in 1842
1825 establishments in England
Gothic Revival church buildings in Greater Manchester
19th-century Roman Catholic church buildings in the United Kingdom
Grade II listed Roman Catholic churches in England